The 2000-01 International Baseball League of Australia was the 2nd season of the League. The 2000-01 leagues was to consist of 3 parts; A traditional Claxton Shield Tournament, to be played in late December 2000, an All-Star game and an International Development League to be played exclusively on the Gold Coast at Palm Meadows and Carrara Oval from late November 2000 to late January 2001.

Claxton Shield
The 2000-01 Claxton Shield was to be held at Blacktown International Ballpark in the week after Christmas. The Tournament was canceled in early December due to the grounds being unfit for play. The timing of a Tournament was also unpopular with many of the players.

All-Star Challenge
The All-Star Challenge was scheduled for the Australia Day weekend 26–28 January 2001, it was to be held at Colonial Stadium, Melbourne. The weekend was to be contested by the Australia national baseball team and an All-Star team that was rumored to include MLB player Roberto Alomar. The game was canceled at the same time at the 2000-01 Claxton Shield.

Development League

The 2000–01 International Baseball League of Australia Development League season, also known as the Gold Coast League, was the first season the Development League was conducted. The League was held exclusively on the Gold Coast, and was contest between 4 teams, Australia, Taiwan, MLB All-Stars and Internationals.

The league was held from 29 November 2000 to 20 January 2001, The one game Championship playoff was won by the IBLA Internationals on 21 January 2001. The Internationals defeated Australia 2–1.

Teams

Rosters 

The 2000–01 season involved four teams: IBLA Australia, IBLA Internationals, MLB Stars and the Taiwan national Baseball team. All teams played on a home and away basis at the same two venues.

Venues

Regular season
The regular season fixture consisted of 78 games. Each team played each other on a home and away basis.

Ladder

Statistical leaders

Postseason
All games for the 2001 postseason were played at Palm Meadows on the Gold Coast. All finals were a 1-game play-off.

Finals Series
Winners of Game 1 and 2 went into Championship games, Losers of game 1 and 2 went into a playoff for 3rd.

Game 1 1st vs 4th: 19 January 2001

Game 2 2nd vs 3rd: 19 January 2001

Game 3 Loser 1 vs Loser 2: 20 January 2001

Game 4 Championship Game: 21 January 2001

Awards

Top Stats

All-Star team

References

 

 
International Baseball League of Australia seasons
Lea
Lea